Anwia-Nkwanta is a village in the Bekwai Municipal district, a district in the Ashanti Region of Ghana.

References

Populated places in the Ashanti Region